The Sava Bohinjka is a headwater of the Sava River in northwestern Slovenia. At  in length, it is the shorter of the two headwaters that become the Sava River in Radovljica, the other being the -long Sava Dolinka.

Course

Until it reaches Lake Bohinj, the river is known as the Savica ('little Sava'), and features the -high Savica Falls at its source. It then flows through the Ukanc Gorge, where the 3 MW Savica power plant is located, before flowing into Lake Bohinj, where it creates a small delta. It flows from Lake Bohinj as the Sava Bohinjka through Bohinjska Bistrica, Bohinjska Bela, and close to Lake Bled, before meeting the Sava Dolinka near Radovljica.

References

External links
 
 Condition of Sava Bohinjka at Sveti Janez and Bodešče - graphs, in the following order, of water level, flow and temperature data for the past 30 days (taken at Sveti Janez and Bodešče by ARSO)

Rivers of Upper Carniola
Rivers of the Julian Alps
Municipality of Bohinj
Municipality of Bled
Municipality of Radovljica